The Pakistan national women's cricket team toured South Africa in 2006–07, playing five women's One Day Internationals. South Africa won the series 5–0.

WODI series

1st ODI

2nd ODI

3rd ODI

4th ODI

5th ODI

References

Women's international cricket tours of South Africa
2007 in South African cricket
2007 in women's cricket
2007 in South African women's sport
South Africa 2007
Women 2004-05
International cricket competitions in 2006–07
January 2007 sports events in Africa
2007 in Pakistani women's sport